Anthony Wilson (born December 13, 1968) is a Canadian sprinter. He competed in the men's 200 metres at the 1992 Summer Olympics.

References

Canadian male sprinters
1968 births
Living people
Athletes (track and field) at the 1991 Pan American Games
Athletes (track and field) at the 1992 Summer Olympics
Olympic track and field athletes of Canada
Pan American Games track and field athletes for Canada